E-gasoline or E-benzin is a synthetic fuel created by Audi for use in automobiles. Audi is developing the fuel together with Global Bioenergies S.A. E-gasoline is essentially a liquid isooctane fuel and it is considered to be a carbon-neutral fuel. The fuel is sulfur- and benzene-free.

Production
It is currently produced from biomass in a two-step process. In the first step gaseous isobutene (C4H8) is produced by Global Bioenergies. Then, in the second step, Fraunhofer Center for Chemical Biotechnological Processes adds additional hydrogen to transform it into isooctane (C8H18).

See also
 Electrofuel

References

Audi
Synthetic fuels

Renewable energy